Polák (feminine Poláková) is a surname meaning "a Pole". Notable people with the surname include:

 Elena Moskalová-Poláková, Czech volleyball player
 Jakub Polák (anarchist) (1952–2012), Czech anarchist and Roma rights activist
 Jan Polák (born 1981), Czech international footballer
 Jan Polák (defender) (born 1989), Czech footballer
 Katarína Poláková, Slovak basketball player
 Marta Poláková (born 1934), Czech chess master
 Michal Polák (disambiguation), several persons
 Roman Polák (born 1986), Czech  ice hockey player
 Vojtěch Polák (born 1985), Czech ice hockey player

See also 

 Polack (disambiguation)
 Polak
 Polášek
 Poliakoff
 Pollack (surname)
 Pollak
 Polyakov

References 

Czech-language surnames
Slovak-language surnames
Jewish surnames
Ethnonymic surnames